Llano de Piedra is a town and corregimiento in Macaracas District, Los Santos Province, Panama with a population of 1,737 as of 2010. Its population as of 1990 was 1,756; its population as of 2000 was 1,843.

References

Corregimientos of Los Santos Province
Populated places in Los Santos Province